Werner Hoffmann (13 January 1918 – 8 July 2011) was a German Luftwaffe night fighter ace and recipient of the Knight's Cross of the Iron Cross, the highest award in the military and paramilitary forces of Nazi Germany during World War II. Hoffmann was credited 51 aerial victories, 50 of them at night, claimed in 192 combat missions.

Early life and career
Hoffmann was born on 13 January 1918 in Stettin, present-day Szczecin in the West Pomeranian Voivodeship in Poland, at the time in the Province of Pomerania of the German Empire. He was the only child of Walter, a ship building engineer, and Gertrud Hoffmann. In 1924, Hoffmann began his schooling at the Volksschule, a primary school, in Stettin. A year later, the family moved to Berlin, settling in Wilmersdorf. There, in 1928, he attended a Gymnasium, a secondary school.

Hoffmann began flying gliders in 1932 and joined the Luftwaffe in December 1936, learning to fly with the Luftkriegsschule 3 (LKS 3—3rd air war school), Wildpark-West near Werder. He was awarded his pilot's badge in June 1938 and was then posted to 7. Staffel of Jagdgeschwader 234 (JG 234—234th Fighter Wing), a squadron of III. Gruppe. III. Gruppe of JG 234 was eventually redesignated I. Gruppe of Zerstörergeschwader 52 (ZG 2—52nd Destroyer Wing) in May 1939 and was equipped with the new Messerschmitt Bf 110 heavy fighter.

World War II
World War II in Europe began on Friday 1 September 1939 when German forces invaded Poland. Hoffmann was assigned to 4. Staffel of Zerstörergeschwader 2 (ZG 2—2nd Destroyer Wing) in early 1940 and participated in the Battle of France. He claimed his aerial first aerial victory, a Royal Air Force (RAF) Hawker Hurricane fighter over Dunkirk, on 24 May 1940. That day, he also shot down Flying Officer Peter Cazenove in his Supermarine Spitfire from No. 92 Squadron. On 19 June, he hit by ground fire during a ground attack mission on French troops but returned to his airfield. Hoffmann sustained injuries in his left elbow, requiring weeks of convalescence.

In July 1940, Hoffmann was transferred to Ergänzungs-Zerstörergruppe Værløse as an instructor with the rank of Oberleutnant and appointed Staffelkapitän (squadron leader). He remained with the unit until 3 August 1941, when the unit was disbanded. He then underwent conversion training as a night fighter pilot.

Night fighter career

Following the 1939 aerial Battle of the Heligoland Bight, RAF attacks shifted to the cover of darkness, initiating the Defence of the Reich campaign. By mid-1940, Generalmajor (Brigadier General) Josef Kammhuber had established a night air defense system dubbed the Kammhuber Line. It consisted of a series of control sectors equipped with radars and searchlights and an associated night fighter. Each sector named a Himmelbett (canopy bed) would direct the night fighter into visual range with target bombers. In 1941, the Luftwaffe started equipping night fighters with airborne radar such as the Lichtenstein radar. This airborne radar did not come into general use until early 1942.

Hoffmann was posted as Staffelkapitän to 5. Staffel of Nachtjagdgeschwader 3 (NJG 3—3rd Night Fighter Wing) based at Schleswig. On the night of 25/26 June 1942, Hoffmann shot down two twin-engine bombers during the 1,000-bomber raid on Bremen. Hoffmann was appointed Staffelkapitän of 4. Staffel of Nachtjagdgeschwader 5 (NJG 5—5th Night Fighter Wing) on 11 February 1943.

Group commander
Hoffmann then served with I./NJG 1, based at Sint-Truiden, Saint-Trond in French pronunciation. On 4 July 1943, he was appointed Gruppenkommandeur (group commander) of I. Gruppe of NJG 5, succeeding Hauptmann Siegfried Wandam in this capacity.

On 15 November, Hoffmann was awarded the German Cross in Gold for 15 victories and by the end of 1943 had a victory total of 18.  On 20 January 1944 Hoffmann had to bail out over Berlin when his aircraft was damaged by return fire from an RAF Lancaster.  On the night of 28/29 January he shot down three Halifax bombers raiding Berlin and claimed two Lancaster bombers shot down the next night.

Hoffmann was awarded the Knight's Cross of the Iron Cross for 31 victories on 4 May 1944. On 29 June, Hoffmann shot down a four-engine bomber but again bailed out when his aircraft received hits from defensive fire from the bomber.  On the night of 7/8 July he shot down three RAF bombers.  In late July 1944 I./NJG 5 was withdrawn to Stendal for re-equipment with the Ju 88 G-6. Deployed to East Prussia, Hoffmann claimed four victories over Soviet-flown aircraft around Libau during December 1944.

By early 1945 Hoffmann had 44 victories.  Following the Soviet offensive on 12 January 1945, Major Hoffmann flew ground-attack operations against ground forces. Hoffmann claimed a further seven victories during 1945.  On the night of 16/17 March 1945, Hoffmann claimed three aerial victories but was himself shot down. His first claim, a Lancaster bomber, was shot down southwest of Schwäbisch-Hall, a Halifax bomber was destroyed near Ansbach, and a Lancaster bomber was claimed east of Ansbach. Near Nuremberg, his Ju 88 G-6 came under attack from a  No. 239 Squadron De Havilland Mosquito night-fighter flown by Squadron Leader Dennis Hughes and Flight Lieutenant 'Dickie' Percks. His entire crew bailed out with Hoffmann suffered severe bruising to his chest.

On 1 May 1945, Hoffmann joined 7./NJG 3, based at Husum. Hoffmann was recommended for the Knight's Cross of the Iron Cross with Oak Leaves, a presentation was never made.

Later life
Following three months internment in the POW camp at Wiedelah, Hoffmann was released. After the war he studied pharmacy and opened a dispensary in Goslar. In 1957, Hoffmann was engaged by Hoechst AG in Bremen in an advisory role.

Aerial victory claims
Hoffmann was credited with 52 aerial victories, 51 of which by night, claimed in 192 combat missions. He filed four nocturnal aerial victories on the Eastern Front. Foreman, Parry and Mathews, authors of Luftwaffe Night Fighter Claims 1939 – 1945, researched the German Federal Archives and found records for 51 nocturnal victory claims. Mathews and Foreman also published Luftwaffe Aces — Biographies and Victory Claims, listing Hoffmann with 51 claims, including one as a Zerstörer pilot by day, plus one further unconfirmed claim, also by day.

In some instances, aerial victories were claimed and logged in a Planquadrat (PQ—grid reference).

Awards
 Aviator badge (2 June 1938)
 Iron Cross (1939) 
 2nd Class (15 June 1940)
 1st Class (10 July 1940)
 Front Flying Clasp of the Luftwaffe for Night Fighter Pilots
 in Bronze on 21 May 1941
 in Silver on 16 February 1942
 in Gold on 8 July 1943
 German Cross in Gold on 15 November 1943 with I./Nachtjagdgeschwader 5
 Honour Goblet of the Luftwaffe (Ehrenpokal der Luftwaffe) on 28 February 1944 as Hauptmann and pilot
 Knight's Cross of the Iron Cross on 4 May 1944 as Hauptmann and Gruppenkommandeur of the I./Nachtjagdgeschwader 5

Notes

References

Citations

Bibliography

 
 
 
 
 
 
 
 
 
 
 
 
 
 
 
 
 
 
 
 
 
 
 
 
 

1918 births
2011 deaths
Military personnel from Szczecin
People from the Province of Pomerania
Luftwaffe pilots
German World War II flying aces
Recipients of the Gold German Cross
Recipients of the Knight's Cross of the Iron Cross
German prisoners of war in World War II held by the United Kingdom